Marie Marguerite Charlotte de Robespierre (5 February 1760, Arras – 1 August 1834, Paris) was a French writer, known for the memoirs she dictated about the life of her brothers during the French Revolution.

Life 

She was the second daughter of François de Robespierre and Jacqueline Marguerite Carrault, and the sister of Maximilien, Henriette and Augustin Robespierre.

After the death of her mother, she and Henriette were both sent to live with their paternal aunts when her father left their home. They were given the typical education for middle- and upper class daughters in Pre-revolutionary France, and educated in a convent school. In 1781, she left the convent school to live with  her two brothers in Arras (her sister having then died). 

In 1789, her brother Maximilian moved to Paris, and Charlotte and Augustin followed some time later. She lived with Augustin and moved about in the political circles of revolutionary Paris, though she did so only in the capacity of a sister and never played any personal political or public role. She never married, and was described as respectable and entirely devoted to her brothers, to whom she was fiercely loyal. 

When her brother were arrested in 1794, she unsuccessfully petitioned for permission to visit them. She was herself arrested and interrogated, but released. After the fall of her brother she lived under very limited circumstances, and was taken care of by friends. In 1803, she was given a modest pension. During her old age, Albert Laponneraye wrote her memoirs after her dictate. They are heavily focused on the lives of her brothers.  

Charlotte would outlive all her siblings and died in Paris in 1834.

References 

  Gabriel Pioro et Pierre Labracherie, «Charlotte Robespierre, ihren Memoiren und ihre Freunde», dans Maximilien Robespierre, Berlin, éditions Markov, 1958.

External links 
 

1760 births
1834 deaths
People from Arras
18th-century French memoirists